Recipients of the honorary citizenship of Warsaw, in order of date of presentation.

List

Source(s) 
 

Warsaw
Warsaw
Warsaw-related lists